is a country of dwarves thought to be located south of Yamataikoku, which appears in Ancient China's Book of the Later Han and Records of the Three Kingdoms. In Wei Zhi. It is mentioned together with Black tooth country and Naked country.

Overview 
The following are listed in Chinese history books. Book of the Later Han and the so-called Wajin Biography in Records of the Three Kingdoms state that it is located 4,000 miles south of the queen state of Wa-koku.

The Shanhai Jing, a document that precedes the Wajinden, mentions an island called  in the eastern sea. The same book also mentions other dwarfs such as "", "", and "" living in the east and south.

Wajinden 
According to the Wajinden

Book of the Later Han 
According to the Book of the Later Han

Main comparative sites

Tanegashima 

Many have identified Tanegashima with Shujukoku.。This is the result of a study of human bones excavated from Tanegashima Island from the Yayoi period to the Kofun period, with "extreme" short head, short head, and short stature characteristics and that it is consistent with the anthropological characteristics of Shujukoku described in the wajinden.
This is the reason why Tanegashima Island is located in the south of Kyushu.
Tanegashima is located about 4,000 ri south of northern Kyushu, which is about 4,000 ri in the shortest sense of the word, so some Yamatai Kyushu Theorists have compared the country to Tanegashima.。

References

See also 

 
 Sukunabikona、Issun-bōshi
 Korpokkur

Wajinden
Mythological places
States of the Wajinden
Pages with unreviewed translations